This is a list of series released by Asia Television.
1976: Big Sister (大家姐)
1977: Network (電視人)
1978: In Cold Blood (追族)
1978: Crocodile Tears (鱷魚淚)
1978: Superstar (巨星)
1978: Con Gang (奇兵36)
1978: A Hong Kong Tragedy (郎心如鐵)
1978: Chinese New Horoscope (十二生肖)
1979: Reincarnated (天蠶變)
1979: Dragon Strikes (天龍訣)
1979: Sword of Fury (怒劍鳴)
1980: Dynasty (大內群英)
1980: Dynasty II (大內群英續集)
1980: Fatherland (大地恩情)
1980: Gone with the Wind (浮生六劫)
1980: Rainbow Connections (彩雲深處)
1981: The Legendary Fok (霍元甲)
1981: Newark File (女媧行動)
1981: Agency 24 (甜甜廿四味)
1981: The Magnificent 7 (蕩寇誌)
1982: The Fist (陳真)
1982: The Conqueror (雄霸天下)
1982: Another Time, Another Love (再生戀)
1982: Barber Shop (家姐、細佬、飛髮舖)
1983: The Romantic Poet (唐伯虎三戲秋香)
1983: Super Hero (鐵膽英雄)
1983: Young Dowager (少女慈禧)
1984: Drunken Fist (醉拳王無忌)
1984: Butterfly Killer (蝴蝶血)
1984: By Royal Decree (十二金牌)
1984: Empress Wu (武則天)
1984: Drunken Fist II (醉拳王無忌第二輯日帝月后)
1984: Jade Bow Connection (雲海玉弓緣)
1985: Spiritual Marginal (靈界邊緣人)
1985: Stardust Memories (阮玲玉)
1985: The Legendary Prime Minister – Zhuge Liang (諸葛亮)
1985: Ten Brothers (十兄弟)
1985: Five Beauties (群芳頌)
1986: Super Stuntman (狮王之王)
1986: Full House Year (滿堂紅)
1986: The Adventures (冒險家樂園)
1986: The Boy Fighter from Heaven (哪吒)
1986: Condor in September (九月鷹飛)
1987: Stardust Dream (紅塵)
1987: Adventure in Paradise (香港情)
1987: The Duel (武林故事)
1987: A Royal Affair (當皇帝愛上殭屍)
1987: Genghis Khan (成吉思汗)
1988: Master of Mount Wu Tang (武當之巔)
1988: Legend of Ms. Choi Kam Fa (賽金花)
1988: Bandits from Hong Kong (張保仔)
1989: Shivering Night (夜琉璃)
1989: Dream of Paradise (天堂夢)
1989: The Vampire Detective (殭屍神探)
1989: The Righteous Cop (男大當差)
1989: The Legend of Fu Hung Suet (傅紅雪傳奇)
1989: Immortal Love (我的野蠻殭屍女友)
1989: Master of Mount Wu Tang II (武當之巔之二 崑崙第一刀)
1989: Father & Son (兜亂兩仔爺)
1989: The P.I. On Call (妙探出租)
1989: (安樂茶飯)
1989: Fun Time (吳耀漢攪攪震 or 六星級攪攪震) 
1990: The Street Market Ninja (街市忍者)
1990: The Merciless Law (法本無情)
1990: The Blood Sword (中華英雄)
1990: Housekeeper, My Honey (樓下伊人)
1991: The Good, the Ghost and the Cop (隔離差館有隻鬼)
1991: Rebuilding Prosperity (再造繁榮)
1992: Shanghai Godfather (再見黃埔灘)
1992: Vampire Hero (殭屍英雄)
1992: Mythical Crane, Magic Needle '92 (仙鶴神針)
1993: Shanghai Godfather II (再見黃埔灘 II 之再起風雲)
1993: The Silver Tycoon (銀狐)
1993: The Legendary Poet (青蓮居士)
1993: The Master of War (孫子兵法)
1993: Vampire Cops (偵探殭屍)
1993: Reincarnated II (天蠶變之再與天比高)
1994: The Movie Tycoon (戲王之王)
1994: Bays of Being Parents (可憐天下父母心)
1994: Beauty Pageant (鳳凰傳説)
1994: Vampire Magistrate (殭屍與律師)
1994: The Odd Couple (拿破崙與小殭屍)
1994: Secret Battle of the Majesty (君臨天下)
1994: Outlaw Hero (法外英雄)
1994: The Kung Fu Master
1995: Justice Junior (九品芝麻官)
1995: Vampire Expert (殭屍道長)
1995: Justice Pao (a.k.a. Judge Bao) (包青天)
1995: Shanghai Godfather III (再見黃埔灘 III 之殭屍天下)
1995: Fist of Fury (精武門)
1995: The Young Master (少年韓非子之長江後浪推前浪)
1995: Vampire Hero II (殭屍大俠)
1995-1996: Wong Fei Hung Series (黃飛鴻新傳)
1996: I Have a Date with Spring (我和春天有個約會)
1996: The Little Vagrant Lady (飃零燕)
1996: Outlaw Hero II (法外英雄II之生死鬥)
1996: The Kung Fu King III (功夫之王 III 十大天王)
1996: The Good Old Days (再見艷陽天)
1996: King of Gamblers (千王之王重出江湖)
1996: Vampire Expert II (殭屍道長II)
1996: Tales From The Dorms (坊間故事之甘戴綠頭巾)
1997: The Little Vagrant Lady II (飃零燕 II 之孤星淚)
1997: Year of Chameleon (97變色龍)
1997: Coincidentally (等著你回來)
1997: Legend of the Vampire (殭屍的故事)
1997: I Have a Date with Summer (我和夏天有個約會)
1997: The Comeback (等著香港回來)
1997: The Pride of Chaozhou (我來自潮州)
1997: Gold Rush (著數一族)
1998: Thou Shalt Not Cheat (呆佬賀壽)
1998: The Vampire Anthologies (殭屍的寓言)
1998: The Heroine of the Yangs (穆桂英大破天門陣)
1998: The Little Vagrant Lady III (飃零燕 III 之悲慘世界)
1998: Heroine of the Yangs II (穆桂英 II 十二寡婦征西)
1998: I Come From Guangzhou (我來自廣州)
1998: My Date with a Vampire (我和殭屍有個約會)
1999: Ten Tigers of Canton (廣東十虎) co-produced with the Sanlih Network from Taiwan
1999: Flaming Brothers (縱橫四海)
1999: The Heroine of the Yangs III (穆桂英 III否極泰來)
1999: Young Hero Fong Sai Yuk (少年英雄方世玉)
2000: Divine Retribution (世紀之戰)
2000: I was Born in Beijing (我來自北京)
2000: My Date with a Vampire 2 (我和殭屍有個約會II)
2000: Showbiz Tycoon (影城大亨)
2000: Wonder Bar (快活谷)
2000: Anywhere But Here (妳想的愛)
2000: Battlefield Network (電視風雲)
2001: To Where He Belongs (縱橫天下)
2001: Outlaw Hero: The Next Generation (新法外英雄)
2001: Healing Hearts (俠骨仁心)
2001: Thank You Grandpa (祖先開眼)
2002: Mission in Trouble (雄心密令)
2004: Asian Heroes (亞洲英雄)
2004: My Date with a Vampire 3 – the Eternal Legend (我和殭屍有個約會III之永恆國度)
2005: Happy Family (喜有此理)
2005: Central Affairs (情陷夜中環)
2006: Central Affairs 2 (情陷夜中環 2)
2006: Tales of Walled Village (大城小故事)
2006: Relentless Justice (AKA No Turning Back) (義無反顧)
2006: Fox Volant of the Snowy Mountain (雪山飛狐)
2008: Flaming Butterfly (火蝴蝶)
2010: The Men of Justice (法網群英)
2010: Who's the Hero (勝者為王)
2010: Hong Kong Go Go Go (香港GoGoGo)

External links 
hkatv.com

 
Asia Television
Lists of Hong Kong television series